Anna Lindahl (24 March 1904 – 17 February 1952) was a Swedish film actress. She appeared in 19 films between 1925 and 1949.

Selected filmography

 Ingmar's Inheritance (1925)
 The Triumph of the Heart (1929)
 The Love Express (1932)
 Man's Way with Women (1934)
 Under False Flag (1935)
 Comrades in Uniform (1938)
 Emilie Högquist (1939)
 If I Could Marry the Minister (1941)
 The Yellow Clinic (1942)
 Young Blood (1943)
 I Killed (1943)
 Motherhood (1945)
 Sunshine Follows Rain (1946)
 A Ship to India (1947)
 Big Lasse of Delsbo (1949)

External links

 

1904 births
1952 deaths
Swedish film actresses
Actresses from Stockholm
20th-century Swedish actresses